Raúl Zerimar Ramírez Cota (born November 19, 1994, in Sinaloa) is a Mexican professional footballer who currently plays for U. de G. He made his professional debut with Chiapas during a Copa MX defeat to Veracruz on 26 February 2014.

References

1994 births
Living people
Mexican footballers
Association football midfielders
Chiapas F.C. footballers
Murciélagos FC footballers
Loros UdeC footballers
Leones Negros UdeG
Ascenso MX players
Liga Premier de México players
Footballers from Sinaloa
People from Ahome Municipality